is a former Japanese football player.

Club statistics

References

External links

1985 births
Living people
Association football people from Shizuoka Prefecture
Japanese footballers
J1 League players
J2 League players
Shimizu S-Pulse players
Sagan Tosu players
Association football forwards